Nick Ciancio (born 21 February 1947) is an Australian weightlifter. He competed in the men's middle heavyweight event at the 1972 Summer Olympics.

References

External links
 

1947 births
Living people
Australian male weightlifters
Olympic weightlifters of Australia
Weightlifters at the 1972 Summer Olympics
Place of birth missing (living people)
Commonwealth Games medallists in weightlifting
Commonwealth Games gold medallists for Australia
Weightlifters at the 1970 British Commonwealth Games
Weightlifters at the 1974 British Commonwealth Games
20th-century Australian people
21st-century Australian people
Medallists at the 1970 British Commonwealth Games
Medallists at the 1974 British Commonwealth Games